Tanya Fisher is an Australian former professional basketball player. She played eight seasons in the Women's National Basketball League (WNBL) and was a member of the Perth Breakers team that won the championship in 1992, where she earned grand final MVP. In 1990 with Perth, she averaged 1.0 blocked shots per game, and 1991, she averaged 1.1 blocked shots per game and had a .519 field goal percentage (69/113), also with Perth. Her final WNBL season came in 1997. As of the 2011/12 WNBL season, Fisher was in the top five all-time in the following categories for Perth: field goal percentage (48%, 528/1111), free throw attempts (343), fouls (366), offensive rebounds (239), defensive rebounds (392), and total rebounds (631, 141 games).

Fisher also played in the State Basketball League for numerous teams:
Perth 1989–1991, 54g, 1042pt @ 19.3
Willetton 1992, 15g, 329pt @ 21.9
Perth 1994–1996, 55g, 873pt @ 15.9
Cockburn 1997, 11g, 178pt @ 16.2
Mandurah 1998, 25g, 457pt @ 18.3
Mandurah 2000–2002, 63g, 531pt @ 8.4

In 1995, she was named the Most Valuable Player of the Women's State Basketball League.

References

External links
Tanya Fisher at sportstg.com
"FLASHBACK: The way they were" at thewest.com.au

Living people
Australian women's basketball players
Year of birth missing (living people)